The Women's 200m T12 had its first round held on September 15, beginning at 10:00. The Semifinals were held on September 16, at 9:41 and the A and B Finals were held on September 16 at 17:05.

Medalists

Results

References
Round 1 - Heat 1
Round 1 - Heat 2
Round 1 - Heat 3
Round 1 - Heat 4
Semifinals - Heat 1
Semifinals - Heat 2
Final A

Athletics at the 2008 Summer Paralympics
2008 in women's athletics